Kim & Chang is an international law firm headquartered in Seoul. Founded in 1973, it is the largest law firm in South Korea by headcount, with over 1,200 professionals and offices in Seoul, Hong Kong, Singapore, and Ho Chi Minh City. In 2016, it became the first Korean law firm to be included in the world's top 100 law firms by the American Lawyer, ranking 59th with a revenue of $686 million.

The firm employs numerous attorneys educated and licensed in the United States, Japan, China, and Europe. Approximately 20 percent of its lawyers are foreign-qualified, and it has a division of around 200 personnel devoted to Japan-related practice. In addition to attorneys, the firm employs patent attorneys, tax attorneys, economists, and industry-specific experts.

History

Kim & Chang was founded by attorney Young Moo Kim in 1973. Kim had studied in the United States for several years, obtaining a Master of Comparative Law degree from the University of Chicago Law School in 1967 and a Juris Doctor degree from Harvard Law School in 1970. Based on his experience, he sought to create a Korean law firm that followed American standards of legal service, and was the first recruiter of foreign attorneys in Korea. Once Kim established the firm in January 1973, a former judge and Kim's longtime friend, Soo Kil Chang joined later that year.

Recognition & Awards

 Kim & Chang recognized as top-tier law firm in all areas in Asia Pacific Legal 500 (2010/11 edition)
 Kim & Chang chosen as leader in all practice areas - IFLR 1000 (2011 edition)
 Kim & Chang named "Korea's Law Firm of the Year" for the fifth time - 2010 Who's Who Legal Awards.
 Winner of the "Client Choice Awards 2010" - International Law Office (ILO)
 Winner of South "Korean Law Firm of the Year" - The Chambers and Partners Asia Awards 2010
 Highest-ranked Asian law firm by Japanese corporate legal departments in the December 2013 Nihon Keizai Shimbun survey.

References

External links
 Kim & Chang (official website)
 Kim & Chang - Information on Chambers Asia

Law firms of South Korea